The Assistant Secretary of the Navy (AIR) was a civilian office of the United States Department of the Navy. The Assistant Secretary of the Navy (AIR) initially reported to the Assistant Secretary of the Navy and later to the Under Secretary of the Navy.

With the emergence of naval aviation as a major new military technique, the Navy had increasingly large organizations to oversee it. From 1910, there was an Officer in Charge of Aviation, then a Director of Naval Aeronautics, then in 1916 a Director of Naval Aviation. In 1921, Congress replaced those positions with a distinct Bureau of Aeronautics. Finally, on June 24, 1926, Congress created the position of Assistant Secretary of the Navy for Aeronautics to oversee the United States' naval aviation forces. The position was vacant from 1932 until 1941, and upon being re-occupied, the position was re-titled Assistant Secretary of the Navy (AIR) on September 11, 1941.

On February 6, 1959, the office was redesignated Assistant Secretary of the Navy (Research and Development). In April 1977, the name was changed to Assistant Secretary of the Navy (Research, Engineering and Systems).

The office was disestablished in 1990, when the office was merged with the office of Assistant Secretary of the Navy (Shipbuilding and Logistics) to create the new office of Assistant Secretary of the Navy (Research, Development and Acquisitions).

Assistant Secretaries of the Navy for Aeronautics, 1926—1932

Assistant Secretaries of the Navy (AIR), 1941—1959

Assistant Secretaries of the Navy (Research and Development), 1959—1977

Assistant Secretaries of the Navy (Research, Engineering and Systems), 1977—1990

References

Office of the Secretary of the Navy
United States naval aviation